The Great Artist is a 2020 American short drama film directed by Indrani Pal-Chaudhuri and written and produced by Sunny Vachher and Matthew Postlethwaite. Starring Matthew Postlethwaite, the rest of the cast includes Marimar Vega, Rain Valdez and Benjamin Patterson.

The film was produced during the COVID-19 pandemic and enjoyed a successful festival run, which began virtually on December 31, 2020 in that month's edition of the 2020 TopShorts Film Festival. This resulted in it winning and being nominated for numerous awards, including for Postlethwaite's performance, Indrani Pal-Chaudhuri's directing, Richi Carter's score and the original song "Brave" (which was written by Matthew Postlethwaite, Jon Altham and Pia Toscano; performed by Pia Toscano), which made history as the first song from a live-action short film to win the Hollywood Music in Media Award for Outstanding Song Written for Visual Media (Short Film). The film qualified for consideration for the Live Action Short Film shortlist for the 93rd Academy Awards and was selected by The Hollywood Reporter as one of the Oscars' Top 5 Live Action Shorts.

Premise
A gifted artist finds himself in a broken balance between creating world class art and the all too silent struggle of self care as his life begins to unravel because of his Dissociative Identity Disorder.

Cast
 Matthew Postlethwaite as The Great Artist
 Marimar Vega as Perry
 Rain Valdez as Angela
 Benjamin Patterson as Charlie
 Kalena Ranoa as Odette
 Addison Brasil as Henry Austin
 Julia Black as The Host

Production

Development and pre-production
Postlethwaite created the story and wrote the film with Vachher at the beginning of January 2020 as a way to bring awareness to mental health, inspired by Postlethwaite’s experience when he was admitted to the hospital in his 20s for feeling suicidal. Postlethwaite further added in an interview for Albuquerque Journal, "As I talk about it, it becomes easier. A lot of people are more open to talk about their struggles with mental health. We need to know that we’re not alone. That’s what we’re trying to do with the film. We’re trying to open the conversation.” Later that year, Postlethwaite and Producer Sunny Vachher's production company, Purpose Co., received the green-light from SAG-AFTRA to move forward with production, and received endorsements from various major mental health organizations.

The film has the support of major organizations such as GLAAD, American Foundation of Suicide Prevention, National Suicide Prevention Lifeline, Movember, Kindred, Tethr, The Tramuto Foundation, and Stand with Impact, with the National Alliance on Mental Illness (NAMI) further sponsoring the film at the Julien Dubuque International Film Festival.

Filming
Filming took place in Los Angeles, California with COVID-19 safety protocols in place, with production ending with zero positive cases for the virus.

Reception
"It is the climax that is truly brilliant -- one that earned the film a consideration for the Live Action Short Film shortlist for the 93rd Academy Awards...Are we all striving to achieve 'greatness' by holding our authentic self hostage? This is the haunting question that Pal-Chaudhuri leaves her viewers with," according to Prerna Mittra of The Indian Express.

Markos Papadatos of Digital Journal was positive about the film and praised Postlethwaite's performance, writing that "...he is not afraid to be raw and vulnerable, where one can really hear his heart in this short movie. He layers his emotions well and he delves beyond the surface to bring this complex character to life." He then went on to add that "It truly underscores the fact that for great art to be produced, there needs to be major suffering. Viewers are bound to find it warm, heartfelt, and relatable, especially in the era of COVID-19."

Christopher Henry of The Blunt Post praised the directing, cinematography, writing and performances, concluding his review that "It manages not only to humanize not only the illness of DID but to humanize the idea of an artist as well. That behind the carefully constructed work of beauty, lies the turmoil and sorrow that one had to endure to produce it."

Accolades

References

External links
 Official Site
 

2020 films
2020 short films
2020 drama films
2020 LGBT-related films
American drama short films
Films about depression
Films about dissociative identity disorder
Films about fictional painters
Films about suicide
Films impacted by the COVID-19 pandemic
American nonlinear narrative films
Films shot in Los Angeles
American LGBT-related short films
2020s English-language films
2020s American films